Providence County, Rhode Island schools

High schools
(9th-12th grade unless otherwise noted)

Middle and junior high schools (6th-8th grade unless otherwise noted)

Elementary schools (kindergarten-5th grade unless otherwise noted)

Other schools

References

Education in Providence, Rhode Island
 
Providence County